André Villiers (born 13 December 1954) is a French politician of the Union of Democrats and Independents (UDI) who has been serving as a member of the French National Assembly since 18 June 2017, representing the second ward of the department of Yonne.

Political career 
In 2001, Villiers was elected as the mayor of Pierre-Perthuis, and would remain there until 2008 when he became the mayor of Vézelay under The Centrists. He was  also councilor for the Yonne commune from 1992 to 2015.

In parliament, Villiers serves on the Committee on Economic Affairs.

Political positions 
Villiers is considered a supporter of President Ilham Aliyev of Azerbaijan.

References

1954 births
Living people
Deputies of the 15th National Assembly of the French Fifth Republic
Union of Democrats and Independents politicians
Senators of Yonne
Deputies of the 16th National Assembly of the French Fifth Republic